Zbigniew Seifert (7 June 1946 – 15 February 1979) was a Polish jazz violinist.

Seifert was born in Kraków, Poland. He played alto saxophone early in his career and was influenced by John Coltrane. He devoted himself to jazz violin when he began performing with the Tomasz Stańko Quintet in 1970, and became one of the leading modern jazz violinists. Seifert relocated to Germany in 1973, and worked with Hans Koller's Free Sound between 1974 and 1975.  The following year, he performed alongside John Lewis at the Montreux Jazz Festival.  Seifert later recorded with Oregon.

He died of cancer at the age of 32, and is buried at Rakowicki Cemetery in Krakow.

Discography

As leader
 Zbigniew Seifert (Capitol, 1977)
 Man of the Light (MPS, 1977)
 Solo Violin (EMI Electrola, 1978)
 Passion (Capitol, 1979)
 Kilimanjaro (PolJazz, 1979)
 We'll Remember Zbiggy (Mood, 1979)
 We'll Remember Komeda (Polonia, 1998)
 Live in Hamburg 1978 (Milo, 2006)
 Nora (GAD, 2010)
 Live in Solothurn  (2017)

As sideman
With Tomasz Stanko
 Music for K (Polskie Nagrania, 1970)
 Jazzmessage from Poland (B.Free, 1972)
 Purple Sun (Calig, 1973)
 W Pałacu Prymasowskim (PolJazz, 1983)

With others
 Boogie Pimps, The Music in Me (Superstar, 2005)
 Hans Koller, Kunstkopfindianer (MPS/BASF, 1974)
 Hans Koller, Nome (B.Free, 2017)
 Volker Kriegel, Lift! (MPS/BASF, 1973)
 Joachim Kühn, Cinemascope (MPS/BASF, 1974)
 Joachim Kühn, Springfever (Atlantic, 1976)
 Charlie Mariano, Helen 12 Trees (MPS/BASF, 1976)
 Glen Moore, Introducing (Elektra, 1979)
 Oregon, Violin (Vanguard, 1978)
 Jiří Stivín, 5 Ran Do Cepice (Supraphon, 1972)
 Jasper van 't Hof, Eye Ball (Keytone, 1974)
 Jan "Ptaszyn" Wróblewski, Sprzedawcy Glonow (Polskie Nagrania, 1973)

References

External links
 Passion - The Zbigniew Seifert Documentary
 
 

1946 births
1979 deaths
20th-century jazz composers
20th-century male musicians
20th-century Polish musicians
Avant-garde jazz musicians
Jazz alto saxophonists
Male jazz composers
Male violinists
Musicians from Kraków
Polish jazz composers
Polish jazz violinists
Polish saxophonists
20th-century violinists
20th-century saxophonists